Javier Irazun (born 4 December 1986 in Uruguay) is an Uruguayan footballer who plays for Liga Nacional club Iztapa.

Career
Irazun started his senior career with CA Fénix. In 2013, he signed for Sud América in the Uruguayan Primera División, where he made eighty-nine league appearances and scored zero goals. After that, he played for  Comunicaciones, Racing Club de Montevideo, and C.D. Olmedo, where he now plays.

References

External links 
 Javier Irazún. "I am happy to be in a great team"
 Cutting between the mountains
 Javier Irazún: "We must not go crazy, we are not the worst and we are not the best"
 Irazún wins his first Clásico and his second least beaten goalkeeper title

1986 births
Living people
Uruguayan footballers
Association football goalkeepers
Uruguayan expatriate footballers
Expatriate footballers in Guatemala
Expatriate footballers in Ecuador
Club Atlético Fénix players
Tacuarembó F.C. players
Sud América players
Comunicaciones F.C. players
Racing Club de Montevideo players
C.D. Olmedo footballers